Terror at Midnight is a 1956  film noir crime film directed by Franklin Adreon and starring Scott Brady, Joan Vohs and Frank Faylen.

The film's sets were designed by art director Walter E. Keller.

Plot
Rick Rickards, a cop, lends his car to Susan Lang, his fiancée. She accidentally runs into a night watchman riding a bicycle. An eyewitness named Speegle suggests she flee the scene before the watchman regains consciousness.

Susan takes the car to an auto shop run by Fred Hill, who recognizes it as Rick's vehicle. What she doesn't know is that Hill is in business with a couple of criminals, Hanlon and Mascotti. The men are concerned about Hill's alcoholic wife, Helen, who knows too much about their activities.

Speegle shows up at Susan's home, hoping to blackmail her for $500. He finds out her boyfriend is a cop and scrams. Susan is told by Hill that he needs more time to repair her car, Hill now realizing that the car's been involved in an accident, information he can use. Helen, seeing her husband and Susan together, believes he is seeing another woman and, in a fit of drunken jealousy, gets into a truck and runs down Hill, killing him.

Susan ends up suspected of the crime. Helen, in a panic and eager to leave town, goes to Hanlon and Mascotti threatening to tell everything she knows unless they pay her $5,000. They kill her instead. Susan finds the body and becomes the prime suspect in two murders now.

Rick offers to resign from the force, but is urged to stay on it and solve the case. He and another officer end up in a car chase, forcing Hanlon and Mascotti off the road, arresting one and shooting the other. Susan is cleared of all charges and Rick takes her home.

Cast
 Scott Brady as Neal 'Rick' Rickards  
 Joan Vohs as Susan Lang  
 Frank Faylen as Fred Hill  
 John Dehner as Lew Hanlon  
 Virginia Gregg as Helen Hill  
 Ric Roman as Police Sgt. Brazzi  
 John Gallaudet as George Flynn 
 Kem Dibbs as Nick Mascotti  
 Percy Helton as Speegie  
 Francis De Sales as Police Lt. Conway  
 John Maxwell as Police Capt. Allyson  
 Rick Vallin as Police Officer Gaudino 
 John Damler as Police Officer Garfinkle  
 Jose Gonzales-Gonzales as Delivery Man  
 Joi Lansing as Hazel  
 Ruth Lee as Mrs. Lang  
 Doris Singleton as Linda  
 Marjorie Stapp as Waitress  
 Marcia Sweet as Neighborhood Woman  
 Dan Terranova as The Kid  
 Rod Williams as Police Officer Udell

See also
List of American films of 1956

References

Bibliography
 Koper, Richard. Fifties Blondes: Sexbombs, Sirens, Bad Girls and Teen Queens. BearManor Media, 2010.

External links
 

1956 films
1950s crime films
American crime films
Films directed by Franklin Adreon
Republic Pictures films
1950s English-language films
1950s American films
American black-and-white films